Thor Høholt (born 22 February 2001) is a Danish professional footballer who plays as a centre-back for Nykøbing FC, on loan from Lyngby.

Career
Born in Asnæs, Odsherred, Høholt progressed through the FC Nordsjælland academy. At under-19 level, he moved to Lyngby Boldklub, where he became team captain for their under-19 team.

On 8 July 2020, Høholt made his senior debut in the Danish Superliga in a 1–1 draw against SønderjyskE. At the end of the season, he suffered relegation to the 1st Division with the club on 9 May 2021 after a loss to last-placed AC Horsens.

On 4 June 2021, Høholt signed a new two-year contract with Lyngby, and was permanently promoted to the first team ahead of their new season in the second tier. He made his first start for the club on 4 August in a 9–0 win in the Danish Cup first round against Østerbro IF.

To gain some experience, 20-year old Høholt was loaned out to Faroese club B36 Tórshavn on 25 January 2021 until the end of June 2022. The deal was later extended until the end of August 2022. On 31 August 2022, Høholt was loaned out to Danish 1st Division side Nykøbing FC for the rest of the year.

Career statistics

References

External links

2001 births
Living people
Danish men's footballers
Danish expatriate men's footballers
People from Odsherred Municipality
Association football defenders
FC Nordsjælland players
Lyngby Boldklub players
B36 Tórshavn players
Nykøbing FC players
Danish Superliga players
Danish 1st Division players
Expatriate footballers in the Faroe Islands
Sportspeople from Region Zealand